The Foton Gratour im6 (伽途im6) is a mini MPV produced by Foton, a subsidiary of BAIC Group.

Overview
The Gratour im6 was sold under the Gratour compact MPV product series with prices ranging from 61,900 yuan to 72,900 yuan. Styling is controversial as the front and rear end designs heavily resembles the fifth generation Honda Odyssey.

Foton Gratour im8

The Foton Gratour im8 (伽途im8) is essentially the im6 with more ground clearance, extra plastic claddings and positioned higher in the market. Prices of the Gratour im8 ranges from 70,900 yuan to 79,900 yuan. A higher trim level called the Foton Gratour GT was also based on the Gratour im8 featuring a duo-colored paint job, and a price range from 79,900 yuan to 136,800 yuan.

References

External links 
 (Gratour im6)
 (Gratour im8)
 (Gratour GT)

Cars introduced in 2017
Minivans
Compact MPVs
Front-wheel-drive vehicles
2010s cars
Cars of China